Motown 25: Yesterday, Today, Forever is a 1983 television special, produced by Suzanne de Passe for Motown Records, to commemorate Motown's 25th year (Motown was founded in January 1959). The program was taped before a live audience at the Pasadena Civic Auditorium in Pasadena, California on March 25, 1983, and broadcast on NBC on May 16. Among its highlights were Michael Jackson's performance of "Billie Jean" (which popularized the moonwalk), Smokey Robinson's long-awaited reunion with The Miracles, a Temptations / Four Tops "battle of the bands", Marvin Gaye's inspired speech about black music history and his memorable performance of "What's Going On", a Jackson 5 reunion, and an abbreviated reunion of Diana Ross & the Supremes, who performed their final #1 hit, "Someday We'll Be Together" from 1969. The show was co-written by de Passe with Ruth Adkins Robinson who would go on to write shows with de Passe for the next 25 years, including the follow-up label tributes—through "Motown 40", Buz Kohan was the head writer.

Performances

Junior Walker
Junior Walker performed 30 seconds of his signature hit "Shotgun." It was performed as a solo; The All-Stars, his long-time group, did not participate.

Lionel Richie / The Commodores
Lionel Richie performed his hit "You Mean More To Me" in a pre-taped segment.  Appearing with him was Lynette Butler, identified as a "Sickle Cell Poster Child."  Richie did not appear with his former group The Commodores, who appeared without him on a separate live segment of the special, singing "Brick House," which was led, as on the original recording, by Commodore Walter "Clyde" Orange. The other original Commodores, William King, Ron LaPread, Milan Williams, and Thomas McClary were present and performed on this segment.

Marvin Gaye
Marvin Gaye, who had left the label a year before to sign with Columbia Records and had a current hit with "Sexual Healing," agreed at the last minute to join the roster of other Motown legends to perform. When he came on, he played the piano and gave the audience a narrative of black music history before he stepped off the piano and sang his classic 1971 hit, "What's Going On", to thunderous applause. Gaye's performance on the show, following his appearances on February 23, 1983, on the Grammys and the NBA All-Star Game, was one of his final national television appearances before his murder by his own father in April 1984.

Mary Wells and Martha Reeves
The 'first lady of Motown' Mary Wells and Vandellas frontwoman Martha Reeves were each given a 30-second spot, singing their respective hits, "My Guy" and "Heatwave."

The Jackson 5 / Michael Jackson
Michael Jackson, who had recently released his worldwide best-selling album Thriller, was reunited with his brothers to perform a medley of their hits "I Want You Back", "The Love You Save", "Never Can Say Goodbye", and "I'll Be There". Jermaine was also there, finally performing with his brothers for the first time since leaving the group in 1975, and brother Randy joined the group for the medley as well (When Jermaine left the Jackson 5 for a solo career, Randy had replaced him). Michael Jackson originally turned down the opportunity to perform at the show, believing he had appeared too frequently on television at that time; at Berry Gordy's request, he agreed to perform if he was allotted time for a solo spot, to which Gordy agreed.

Widely hailed as his breakthrough performance as a solo artist, his solo performance followed the Jackson 5 performance. Jackson danced while singing to prerecorded vocals of  "Billie Jean", which at the time was in the middle of a seven-week run atop the Billboard Hot 100 music charts and was the only non-Motown song performed on the show. This was also the first time he performed what would become his most famous signature move, the moonwalk.

In the years followed, Jackson's concert performances of "Billie Jean" would mirror his appearance at Motown 25, from the opening pose with the fedora, black sequin jacket, and glove, to the moonwalk routine in the song's bridge.

The Miracles
This special marked the long-awaited reunion of Motown VP Smokey Robinson with his original group The Miracles: Bobby Rogers, Pete Moore, Claudette Robinson (then wife of Smokey), and Marv Tarplin (who was on stage with them, slightly off-camera to the right, but can be seen in certain shots) for the first time since he left the group 11 years before (in 1972). Original Miracles member Ronnie White did not participate in the reunion for personal reasons (his wife, Earlyn, died that year). As Motown's first group (also the label's first million-selling act) they were first on the show, singing four of their greatest hits, "Shop Around", "You've Really Got a Hold on Me", "The Tears of a Clown", and "Going To A Go-Go".

Stevie Wonder
Stevie Wonder, accompanied by his band and his girl group Wonderlove sang several of his greatest hits, including "I Wish," "Uptight (Everything's Alright)," "Signed, Sealed, Delivered, I'm Yours," "You Are the Sunshine of My Life," "My Cherie Amour," "Sir Duke," and also preceded by a vintage clip of Wonder singing his first hit "Fingertips."

Diana Ross / The Supremes
Motown 25 was a showcase for the highly anticipated reunion of The Supremes: Diana Ross, Mary Wilson and Supremes replacement Cindy Birdsong (original member Florence Ballard had died in 1976). Four of their greatest hits were to be sung that night in a medley including "Baby Love" and "Stop! In the Name of Love", however in rehearsals it was decided to cut the hits medley and sing only "Someday We'll Be Together". Richard Pryor opened the segment with a fairy-tale story of 'three maidens from the Projects of Brewster' which was then followed with a montage of various Supremes' video clips. Ross then started down the center aisle of the auditorium with her hit "Ain't No Mountain High Enough".

When Ross finished, she made a brief speech about 'the night that everyone came back' (although some of the surviving artists and musicians had not been invited). After the beginning chords of "Someday We'll Be Together", Birdsong entered from stage left, and Wilson entered from stage right. Shortly after the first verse, Ross introduced Wilson and Birdsong to the audience while Wilson took over the lead vocals during this segment while Ross introduced Motown labelmates such as Smokey Robinson, Stevie Wonder, and others as they quickly filled the stage for an impromptu finale. Although producer Suzanne de Passe had instructed Ross to introduce Berry Gordy after leading the finale (a fact unknown to Mary Wilson), Wilson decided to do the honors by calling Berry down herself. Additionally, earlier in the program, Wilson made a brief tribute to Ballard, and former label mate Paul Williams of the Temptations. By the time the reunion aired on May 16, Ross/Wilson altercations were widely reported, including an article and pictures in Us Weekly, and the performance resulted in negative publicity for the group.

The Temptations / Four Tops
The Temptations and Four Tops competed in a "Battle of the Bands" style event. The only original or "Classic Five" Temptations performing were Melvin Franklin and Otis Williams, as Eddie Kendricks (who left the group in 1971) and David Ruffin (who left the group in 1968, and was replaced by Dennis Edwards) had a falling out with the group. Paul Williams (who also left the group in 1971) had died in 1973, and Al Bryant (who left the group and was replaced by Ruffin in 1964) had died in 1975.

Joining Williams and Franklin were then-Temptations Dennis Edwards, Richard Street, and Ron Tyson. All of the original members of the Four Tops performed: Renaldo "Obie" Benson, Abdul "Duke" Fakir, and Lawrence Payton, with Levi Stubbs providing the lead vocals. The two groups performed "Reach Out I'll Be There","Baby I Need Your Loving", "Get Ready", "I Can't Help Myself (Sugar Pie Honey Bunch)", "My Girl" "Ain't Too Proud to Beg" and "I Can't Get Next to You", among other numbers. The joint performance was a success, and the Temptations and Four Tops toured together for two years following the special.

This "battle" later returned in a Motown TV special at the Apollo theater and created a long running tour for the two groups to compete in.

Others
While Motown 25 was billed as "Yesterday, Today, Forever", artists from the golden era of Motown, such as The Marvelettes, The Vandellas, The Contours, Kim Weston, Brenda Holloway, Marv Johnson, Jimmy Ruffin, Edwin Starr, Gladys Knight & the Pips, Rare Earth, The Isley Brothers and The Velvelettes were not included in the special, while newer artists such as DeBarge, High Inergy and José Feliciano (who paid homage to Berry Gordy singing "Lonely Teardrops") were. (Singers Nick Ashford and Valerie Simpson appeared onstage at the end with the other artists, but they did not perform.) Non-Motown artists, such as Adam Ant (who paid homage to the Supremes singing "Where Did Our Love Go" with Diana Ross) and Linda Ronstadt were featured as well. Ronstadt performed "Ooh Baby Baby" and "Tracks of My Tears" with Smokey Robinson. She had hits with both songs and in 1976 her version of The Miracles' "Tracks of My Tears" even went to #12 on the Billboard Country Singles Chart, a first for a Motown song.

According to the documentary Standing in the Shadows of Motown, James Jamerson, a key component of the Motown sound, and member of The Funk Brothers who recorded many of the backing tracks to the Motown hits, had to buy a Motown 25 ticket from a scalper and sat at the back of the hall with the general public. In addition, the "Motown Sound," which Motown producer Paul Riser would later credit The Funk Brothers and the musicians at Motown of creating in Standing in the Shadows of Motown, was crudely trivialized during a segment in Motown 25 where executives and employees at Motown, and even Berry Gordy himself, gave all kind of answers to what the Motown Sound was—with no answer giving credit to the musicians.

Additional appearances were made by Dick Clark, Howard Hesseman and Tim Reid (reprising their WKRP in Cincinnati roles as disc jockeys), fast-talker John Moschitta Jr., T.G. Sheppard (who recorded for Motown's 1970s country label and had two #1 hits on Billboard's country chart), Billy Dee Williams, and The Lester Wilson Dancers. Additionally, clips of Rick James and The Mary Jane Girls were featured.

TV ratings
The special was the highest-viewed prime time show in the United States for the week.  9pm to 11pm; Rating: 22.8; Viewers: 33.9 million

Video release

Charts

Certifications

DVD release
Motown 25 was released on DVD through Star Vista Entertainment/Time Life in six-DVD, three-DVD and one-DVD versions on September 30, 2014. Prior to this, the special could only be found on VHS, Laserdisc and a rare pre-recorded 8mm tape. The only footage of Motown 25 on DVD was Michael Jackson's performance of "Billie Jean" which was officially released on the HIStory on Film, Volume II DVD and the DVD included in Thriller 25. There are some differences between the VHS video release and the DVD. On the VHS version, there are a few shots of Berry Gordy seated in the audience that are omitted on the DVD. In addition, some vintage clips that were used on the original broadcast and on the VHS release were replaced, most notably during the Supremes "Stop! In the Name of Love" montage where several different clips of the Supremes singing the word "Stop!" were edited together. The majority of the clips replaced appear to be from a taping of the British show Ready, Steady, Go!: The Sounds of Motown, that featured, along with the Supremes, The Temptations, The Miracles, Martha and the Vandellas, and Stevie Wonder.

Album releases
The original vinyl release of the album, narrated by Lionel Richie and Smokey Robinson, was produced by Jon Badeaux in 1983. The name of that release is The Motown Story: First 25 Years. That album received a Grammy nomination for Best Historical Recording at the 26th Annual Grammy Awards.

Charts

The Motown Story: First 25 Years

Motown 25

References

 Posner, Gerald (2002). ''Motown: Music, Money, Sex, and Power'. New York: Random House. .
 Wilson, Mary and Romanowski, Patricia (1986, 1990, 2000). Dreamgirl & Supreme Faith: My Life as a Supreme. New York: Cooper Square Publishers. .

External links
 

The Jackson 5
Motown
NBC television specials
1983 American television episodes
1991 video albums
1991 live albums
Live video albums
Peabody Award-winning broadcasts
Primetime Emmy Award for Outstanding Variety Series winners
Motown video albums
Television shows directed by Don Mischer